Rowland Henry Rerick (1857 - October 23, 1925) was a newspaper editor, owner, and author of history books in the United States. During the early years of the 20th century, he wrote the book Memoirs of Florida, a book on political parties in Florida, and a history of Ohio.

He was the son of newspaper publisher and Republican local official John Heaton Rerick (February 4, 1830 - January 21, 1911). Rowland joined his father's work and continued it after the elder's death. Rowland continued on as owner and editor of the LaGrange Standard newspaper in LaGrange, Indiana for 14 years until his death. He died at his home in LaGrange.

Writings
 History of Ohio, Covering the Periods of Indian, French and British Dominion, the Territory Northwest, and The Hundred Years of Statehood
 State Centennial history of Ohio : covering the periods of Indian, French and British Dominion, the Territory Northwest, and the hundred years of statehood
 
 
 Political parties in Florida, 1841-1900

References

1857 births
1925 deaths
20th-century American newspaper publishers (people)
People from LaGrange, Indiana
20th-century American historians
19th-century American newspaper editors
20th-century American newspaper editors
Editors of Indiana newspapers
20th-century American male writers
Political historians
Historians from Indiana
Historians of Florida